The Serbian Free Corps, known simply as frajkori, was a volunteer militia composed of ethnic Serbs, established by the Habsburg monarchy, to fight the Ottoman Empire during the Austro-Turkish War (1787–1791). The conflict with Turkish forces ultimately proved inconclusive. The rebellion in the Sanjak of Smederevo and militia's operations resulted in the period of Habsburg-occupied Serbia, which took place from 1788 to 1791. Ultimately, the Serbian volunteer corps had the legacy of promoting the creation of future paramilitaries, such as during the First Serbian Uprising.

History

A Serbian freikorps of 5,000 soldiers had been established in Banat (Banat Military Frontier), composed of refugees that had fled earlier conflicts in the Ottoman Empire. The Corps would fight for liberation of Serbia and unification under Habsburg rule. The main commander was the Austrian major Mihajlo Mihaljević. There were several freikorps along the Habsburg-Ottoman frontier. Mihaljević's Free Corps, the most notable, was active from Šumadija to Podrinje, and across the Morava there was the Braničevo Free Corps; in Croatia the St. George Free Corps; in Bosnia they were called Seressaner. Other Serb militias were the Kozara Militia and Prosar Militia, established in Bosnia in 1788, composed of 1,000 soldiers each.

Among volunteers were Aleksa Nenadović and Karađorđe Petrović, Stanko Arambašić and the prominent Radič Petrović and most distinguished of all, Koča Anđelković. The Orthodox clergy in Serbia supported the rebellion.

Koča's militia quickly took over Palanka and Batočina, attacked Kragujevac, and reached the Constantinople road, cutting off the Ottoman army from Sanjak of Niš and Sanjak of Vidin.

The Austrians used the Corps in two failed attempts to seize Belgrade, in late 1787 and early 1788.

Organization
According to a document from 6 November 1789, the Free Corps included:

 1 squadron of hussars,
 18 companies of fusiliers,
 and 4 companies of musketeers,

with a total of 5,049 soldiers.

Dress
Their uniforms were similar to that of the frontiersmen, with some changes.

Aftermath
In 1793, the Austrians established the new free corps on the border, for Serbians and Bosnians.

Legacy
On the eve of the First Serbian Uprising, the Užice and Sokol nahije established volunteer detachments, called frajkori, that had the task of sabotage against Ottoman military plans, and their concentration in this region of Serbia.

Notable people

Koča Anđelković, captain 1789
Aleksa Nenadović, commander 1804
Vuča Žikić, captain 1808
Petar Novaković Čardaklija, captain 1808
Radič Petrović, captain 1816
Karađorđe Petrović, sergeant 1817

See also

Serbian Militia
Serbian Militia (1718–39)

References

Sources

18th-century Freikorps
Military history of Austria
Military history of Serbia
18th century in Serbia
18th-century establishments in Serbia
Serbia under Habsburg rule
Vojvodina under Habsburg rule
History of Banat
Cavalry units and formations
Infantry units and formations
Habsburg Serbs
Military units and formations of the Early Modern period
Military Frontier
Serbian mercenaries
1787 establishments in the Habsburg monarchy
1792 disestablishments in the Habsburg monarchy
Military units and formations established in 1787
Military units and formations disestablished in 1792
Volunteer military units and formations
Army of the Habsburg monarchy